Peter Fritz Theodor Wilhelm Hans Poleck (8 November 1905 in Lissa – 27 November 1989) was a German Army officer during World War II. He was notable for being a delegate at the German surrender at Lüneburg Heath as a member of the Oberkommando der Wehrmacht (OKW) command group.

Marital status
He was Protestant and until his death in 1989 married with Ilse Poleck née Roeder. They had three sons.

Wehrmacht
Fritz Poleck  belonged from  10 November 1938 to 31 March 1941 to the OKW. He was commanded on 1 April 1941 as First General Staff Officer (Ia) to the 170th Infantry Division (Wehrmacht). With effect from 15 April 1943, its displacement was carried out in the guide reserve of the OKH. By 21 May 1943, he returned as a Quartermaster to the German General Staff.

Promotion to Major General
In this service position he was promoted in accordance with decision of 9 May 1945 retroactive to 20 April 1945 to major general.

Signing of the partial surrender
On 4 May 1945 on the Timeloberg at Wendisch Evern he was a signatory to the unconditional surrender to the British of the German forces in the Netherlands, in north west Germany including all islands, and in Denmark and all naval ships in those areas, with Admiral Hans-Georg von Friedeburg, General Eberhard Kinzel, Rear Admiral Gerhard Wagner and Major Hans Jochen Friedel.

Postwar
After his release from captivity in 1947 Poleck completed a business training, which he finished on September 30, 1949. In October 1950 he joined the Gehlen Organization, the forerunner of the Federal Intelligence Service. In 1957, he joined the Bundeswehr. On 7 November 1957  Federal President Theodor Heuss appointed Fritz Poleck to colonel. Poleck worked officially  for the office for military customer. On 31 March 1964 Poleck retired from active service. He died on 27 November 1989.

Awards
 Iron Cross (1939) 
 2nd Class (25 June 1940)
 1st Class (5 August 1941)
 German Cross in Gold (12 March 1942)
Order of Merit of the Federal Republic of Germany

Literature
Klaus D. Patzwall, Veit Scherzer: Das Deutsche Kreuz 1941-1945. Band II: Geschichte und Inhaber. Verlag Klaus D. Patzwall, Norderstedt 2001, S. 356.

References

1905 births
1989 deaths
German Army personnel of World War II
Officers Crosses of the Order of Merit of the Federal Republic of Germany